Chillon Castle is an island castle located on Lake Geneva, south of Veytaux in the canton of Vaud. It is situated at the eastern end of the lake, on the narrow shore between Montreux and Villeneuve, which gives access to the Alpine valley of the Rhône. Chillon is amongst the most visited medieval castles in Switzerland and Europe. Successively occupied by the House of Savoy, then by the Bernese from 1536 until 1798, it now belongs to the State of Vaud and is classified as a Swiss Cultural Property of National Significance. The Fort de Chillon, its modern counterpart, is hidden in the steep side of the mountain.

Etymology 
According to the Swiss ethnologist Albert Samuel Gatschet, the name Chillon derives from the Waldensian dialect and means "flat stone, slab, platform". The name Castrum Quilonis, attested from 1195, would, therefore, mean "castle built on a rock platform.

Introduction 
The castle of Chillon is built on the island of Chillon, an oval limestone rock advancing in Lake Geneva between Montreux and Villeneuve with a steep side on one side and on the other side the lake and its steep bottom. A garrison could thus control (both militarily and commercially) access to the road to Italy and apply a toll.

Chillon has been a military site since the Roman period and the development of the current castle spans three periods: the Savoy Period, the Bernese Period, and the Vaudois Period.

History

Roman period 
Chillon began as a Roman outpost, guarding the strategic road through the Alpine passes.
Objects dating back to Roman times were discovered during excavations in the 19th century, as well as remains from the Bronze Age. From a double wooden palisade, the Romans would have fortified the site before a square donjon was added in the 10th century. Sources from the 13th century link the possession of the Chillon site to the Bishop of Sion.

Savoy period
The oldest parts of the castle have not been dated definitively, but the first written record of the castle was in 1005AD. It was built to control the road from Burgundy to the Great Saint Bernard Pass.  A charter of 1150, in which Count Humbert III granted the Cistercians of Hautcrêt free passage to Chillon, names the owner of the castle as Gaucher de Blonay, a vassal of the Count of Savoy within the feudal society of the time.

From the mid 12th century, the castle was summer home to the Counts of Savoy, who kept a fleet of ships on Lake Geneva. The castle was greatly expanded in 1248 and 1266-7 by Count Peter II. During this time the distinctive windows were added by Master James of Saint George, who is believed also to have added similar windows to Harlech Castle in Wales at a later date.

Chillon as a prison
During the 16th century Wars of Religion, the dukes of Savoy used the castle to house prisoners. Its most famous prisoner was probably François de Bonivard, a Genevois monk, prior of St. Victor in Geneva and politician, who was imprisoned there in 1530 for defending his homeland from the dukes of Savoy. Over his six-year term, de Bonivard paced as far as his chain would allow, and the chain and rut are still visible.

Bernese period
In 1536, the castle was captured by a Genevois and Bernese army, and all the prisoners, including de Bonivard, were released. The castle became the residence for the Bernese bailiff until Chillon was converted into a state prison in 1733.

Vaudois period
In 1798, the French-speaking canton of Vaud drove out the German-speaking Bernese authorities and declared the Lemanic Republic. The Vaudois invited in French troops to help them maintain autonomy from the other Swiss. When the French moved in and occupied, Chillon was used as a munitions and weapons depot.

Restoration 
Some restoration efforts on the Castle in the 19th Century, inspired by the Romantic vision of aesthetics, sacrificed historical veracity.  At the end of the 19th century, a systematic restoration of the monument was undertaken, through which an ethic of monumental restoration was developed in one of the first cases of the application of archaeology and history to rebuild a structure in a historically accurate way.  This was possible because of the combination of four factors:

He initiated a general survey of the fortress, which was continued and intensified by his replacement as lead architect-archaeologist, who played a major role in the development of archaeology in the Canton of Vaud. Naef devoted twenty years to the study of Chillon. Subordinating aesthetics to historical accuracy, he undertook detailed research into historical archives and conducted extensive archaeological excavations. The process was conscientiously documented in plans, sketches, photographs, and a journal kept by Naef. Until it was abandoned in 1908 the restoration followed a painstaking process of indicating replacement stones with inscriptions on the cut stone (R = Restored; RFS = Restoration facsimile; RL = Free Restoration), or by a change of colour or a red line on the masonry. Naef also restored the interior of the castle, including the tapestries of certain rooms such as the great room of the bailiff, also called the "great Bernese kitchen".
 The creation in 1887 of The Association for the Restoration of Chillon. From the outset, the Association aimed for an "artistic" restoration with the intention of "giving back to objects the character with which they were clothed, almost a latent life, a life impression of the ideas of their time". It is also planned to create a historical museum at the castle.
 The appointment in 1889 of a Technical Commission comprising renowned art historians and architects who specialised in monument restoration. The Commission first met on 27 October 1890 and closely supervised the restoration over subsequent years. De Geymüller played a key role in its success. Drawing on principles published in 1865, and enhanced in 1888, by the Royal Institute of British Architects, he established a framework in the Milestones for the Restoration Program printed in Lausanne in 1896. Naef also joined the Technical Commission on the death of Fivel in 1895.
 The adoption by the Canton of Vaud in 1898 of a law on historic monuments, the first of its kind in Switzerland, which planned to establish a cantonal Commission for historic monuments and to create a cantonal archeologist's post. Naef, who drafted the law, was the first appointee to this function and was responsible for putting in place protection of historical monuments.
The result was judged to be exemplary.  In an 1898 lecture to the Zurich Antiquity Society, Johann Rudolf Rahn boasted about it, while the German Emperor, William II, inquired about the Chillon model when planning the reconstruction of the fortress of Haut-Koenigsbourg.  Due to these restorations, the castle is in excellent condition and is a good model of feudal architecture.

Tourism 
From the end of the 18th century, the castle attracted romantic writers and inspired poets from around the world, including Jean-Jacques Rousseau, Victor Hugo, Alexandre Dumas, Gustave Flaubert, Mary Shelley and Lord Byron.  By 1939, helped by its proximity to the popular tourist destination Montreux, the castle was attracting over 100,000 visitors a year.  By 2005, this number had increased to 300,000.

Chillon remains open to the public for visits and tours on an entrance fee basis and is, according to the castle's website, "Switzerland's most visited historic monument". There are parking spaces and a nearby bus stop. Inside the castle are recreations of the interiors of some of the main rooms including the grand bedroom, hall, and cave stores. Visitors can view four great halls, three courtyards, and a series of bedrooms including the Camera domini, which was occupied by the Duke of Savoy and is decorated with 14th century murals.

In art and popular culture 

Having been inspired by the story of François Bonivard after a visit to the castle, Lord Byron wrote a poem entitled The Prisoner of Chillon in 1816 about François de Bonivard. Byron also carved his name on a pillar of the dungeon.

Letitia Elizabeth Landon included a poetical illustration to a painting of the castle by Samuel Prout (engraved by J. B. Allen),  in Fisher's Drawing Room Scrap Book, 1838.

Gustave Courbet painted the castle several times during his Swiss exile in nearby  La Tour-de-Peilz. The most famous representation is "The Castle of Chillon," oil on canvas painted in 1874 and currently located at the Musée Courbet in Ornans.

In his 1878 novel "Daisy Miller", Henry James has his heroine and a young American compatriot, Winterbourne, visit Chillon Castle. The one-time prison of François Bonivard assumes a symbolic and premonitory significance for Daisy Miller, who thinks she can escape the shackles of social conventions.

In 1890, watchmaker Edouard- GabrielWuthrich, finished a mechanical automaton that took five years to make.  Made of zinc, steel and brass it is a 1/100 scale model illustrating the capture of the castle and liberation of François Bonivard by the Bernese in 1536.  Measuring , it is equipped with a music box with original sheet music handwritten by Genevan composer E. Perrin and includes one hundred moving figurines, including many small soldiers and scenes of torture in dungeons visible through barred windows. The automaton disappeared for decades and was eventually purchased by the Association of Friends of Chillon, the Cantonal Museum of Archeology and History (MCAH) and the Castle Foundation, for 59,000 Swiss francs, at an auction held in Paris in March 2016.

The painter E. Lapierre depicted the castle in oil on canvas in 1896.

Chillon was used as the cover image of Bill Evans' 1968 live album Bill Evans at the Montreux Jazz Festival and inspired the castle in the 1989 Disney animated film The Little Mermaid.

The castle has twice hosted the Compagnie du Graal theatre company, based in Thonon-les-Bains, in 2009 for a sound and light adaptation of Shakespeare's King Lear and again in 2012 for the creation of an epic fresco inspired by the titan of Greek mythology, Hyperion.

Gallery

See also

Fort de Chillon – a 20th-century fort largely buried in the adjoining hillside
 List of castles in Switzerland

Notes

References
 
  
 Fonds : Château de Chillon (600-2013) [Archives de l'Association du château de Chillon (antérieurement Association pour la restauration du château de Chillon) et archives provenant du Secrétariat général du Département de l'instruction publique et des cultes et du Service des bâtiments concernant le château de Chillon : photographies, plans, inventaires, journaux de fouilles, écrits non publiés, contrats, règlements, procès-verbaux, rapports, correspondance, comptabilité, imprimés, publicité, registres des visiteurs du château, dossiers divers, archives de l'architecte Otto Schmid. 172,20 mètres linéaires]. Cote : CH-000053-1 N 2. Archives cantonales vaudoises. (présentation en ligne [archive])
 Denis Bertholet, Olivier Feihl, Claire Huguenin, Autour de Chillon. Archéologie et restauration au début du siècle, Lausanne 1998.
 Claire Huguenin, Patrimoines en stock. Les collections de Chillon, Lausanne 2010.
 Paul Bissegger, «Henri de Geymüller versus E.-E. Viollet-le-Duc: le monument historique comme document et œuvre d'art. Avec un choix de textes relatifs à la conservation patrimoniale dans le canton de Vaud vers 1900», Monuments vaudois 2010, p. 5-40.

External links

 

Chillon, Chateau of
Museums in the canton of Vaud
Cultural property of national significance in the canton of Vaud
Historic house museums in Switzerland
Lake islands of Switzerland
Lake Geneva